Jscrambler is a technology company mainly known for its JavaScript obfuscator and eponymous monitoring framework. The obfuscator makes it harder to reverse engineer a web application's client-side code and tamper with its integrity. For real-time detection of web skimming, DOM tampering and user interface changes, the monitoring framework can be used. Jscrambler's products are used in a number of sectors including finance, broadcasting and online gaming.

History

Early days and founding 
Jscrambler started as AuditMark, which was founded in 2009 by Pedro Fortuna and Rui Ribeiro. The company's initial focus was developing a solution to fight click-fraud in advertising campaigns, since the traffic audit mechanism was JavaScript dependent. The name of the flagship product - Jscrambler - also became the name of the company, which was officially founded in 2014.

Investment 
As of September 2021, Jscrambler had raised a total of US$18.1 million in funding over 3 rounds:

 Seed — In 2014, Jscrambler raised US$800,000 from Portugal Ventures, a public VC and PE firm.
 Seed Extension — In March 2018, Jscrambler raised US$2.3 million in a round led by Sonae IM with the co-investment of Portugal Ventures.
 Series A — In September 2021, Jscrambler raised US$15 million in a round led by Ace Capital Partners, with participation from Sonae IM and Portugal Ventures.

Industry recognition 
In 2019, Jscrambler was recognized by Deloitte in the Technology Fast 500 ranking as one of EMEA's fastest-growing tech companies. Jscrambler was also recognized in Gartner’s 2019 Market Guide for In-App Protection, 2020 Market Guide for Online Fraud Detection, 2020 Hype Cycle for Endpoint Security, and 2021 Hype Cycle for Application Security.

Media and awards 
 2013 Eurocloud Best Cloud Startup Award
 Best solutions for keeping JavaScript clean and secure by Tech Wire Asia
 Staying Safe While Accessing Online Banking by Infosecurity Magazine

References

JavaScript programming tools
Software obfuscation
Internet properties established in 2009
Computer security software companies
Computer security software